This is a list of films by year that have received an Academy Award together with the other nominations for best documentary short film. Following the Academy's practice, the year listed for each film is the year of release: the awards are announced and presented early in the following year. Copies of every winning film (along with copies of most nominees) are held by the Academy Film Archive. Ten films are shortlisted before nominations are announced.

Rules and eligibility

Per the recent rules of the Academy of Motion Picture Arts and Sciences (AMPAS), a Short Subject Documentary is defined as a nonfiction motion picture "dealing creatively with cultural, artistic, historical, social, scientific, economic or other subjects". It may be photographed in actual occurrence, or may employ partial reenactment, stock footage, stills, animation, stop-motion or other techniques, as long as the emphasis is on fact, and not on fiction. It must have a run time of no more than 40 minutes and released during a special eligibility period which may vary from year to year, but generally begins the month of October of the prior year and ends in September of the award year. (This eligibility differs from most other Academy Award categories which only includes films released between January and December of the award year.) The documentary's release must also occur within two years of the film's completion, and there are also rules governing the formatting of audio and video used to produce and exhibit the picture.

In addition, to be eligible the film must meet one of the following criteria:

 complete a commercial showing of at least 7 days in either Los Angeles County, California or anywhere in New York City before being released to other non-theatrical venues such as DVD or TV; or
 regardless of any public exhibition or nontheatrical release the film must have won a qualifying award at a competitive film festival, as specified by the Academy; or
 win a Gold, Silver or Bronze Medal award in the Documentary category of the Academy's Student Academy Award Competition.

The film must run daily for seven days, open to the public for paid admission, and must be advertised in one of the city's major circulars during its run, with screening times included. Additionally, the film must be shown at least once during every day of its qualifying run. Unlike the Best Documentary Feature award, whose rules mandate at least one screening starting between noon and 10 pm local time on each day of the qualifying run, there is no restriction on the start time of any screening. The film must have narration or dialogue primarily in English or with English subtitles, and must be the whole of an original work. Partial edits from larger works and episodes from serialized films are not eligible.

Eligibility rules for prior years may have differed from these.

Nomination process

The Documentary Branch of the Academy first votes to select ten pictures for preliminary nomination, after which a second round of balloting is conducted to select the five documentary nominees. The entire Academy membership will then vote for one of these five for the Oscar. A maximum of two people involved with the production of the documentary may be nominated for the award, one of whom must be the film's credited director. One producer may also be nominated, but if more than one non-director producer is credited the Academy Documentary Branch will vet the producers to select the one they believe was most involved in the creation of the film.

Winners and nominees

1940s

1950s

1960s

1970s

1980s

1990s

2000s

2010s

2020s

Multiple wins

Individuals with multiple wins 
3 wins
 Charles Guggenheim

2 wins
 Malcolm Clarke
 Walt Disney
 Bill Guttentag
 Robin Lehman
 Sharmeen Obaid-Chinoy

Studios with multiple wins 
4 wins
National Film Board of Canada

3 wins
Walt Disney Productions

Individuals with multiple nominations

9 nominations
 Charles Guggenheim

4 nominations
 Karen Goodman
 Freida Lee Mock

3 nominations
 George Casey
 Walt Disney
 Bill Guttentag
 Thomas Lennon
 The March of Time
 Herbert Morgan
 National Film Board of Canada
 Steven Okazaki
 DeWitt L. Sage Jr.
 Terry Sanders
 Kirk Simon
 United States Office of War Information Overseas Motion Picture Bureau
 Dick Young

2 nominations
 Jon Alpert
 Lee R. Bobker
 British Ministry of Information
 Patrick Carey
 Malcolm Clarke
 Skye Fitzgerald
 Roland Hallé
 John Healy
 Gordon Hollingshead
 Bobby Houston
 Daniel Junge
 Steve Kalafer
 Julian Krainin
 Dan Krauss
 Robin Lehman
 Alec Lorimore

 James R. Messenger
 Greg MacGillivray
 Mafilm Studio
 Matthew O'Neill
 Sharmeen Obaid-Chinoy
 Ben Proudfoot
 Robert Richter
 RKO Radio
 Jay Rosenblatt
 Eric Simonson
 Truman Talley
 Francis Thompson
 United States Marine Corps
 Vivienne Verdon-Roe
 Cynthia Wade
 Donald Wrye
 Gerardine Wurzburg
 Ruby Yang

Notes

References

See also
Submissions for Best Documentary Short Academy Award

American documentary film awards
Awards established in 1941
Lists of documentary films
Documentary Short Subject